Bawlakhe District is a district located near the Thanlwin River Basin, Kayah state, Myanmar.

Townships
The district contains the following townships:

Bawlakhe Township 
Hpasaung Township
Mese Township

References 

Districts of Myanmar
Kayah State